Zxx may refer to:

 zxx is a code of the ISO 639-2 and ISO 639-3 standards of language acronyms meaning "no linguistic content".
 ZXx is a codename for bodystyles of the Ford Focus in the US.